Thomas Earle (1810–1876) was a 19th-century British sculptor.

Life

He was born at Osborne Street in Hull in June 1810 the eldest of 12 children of John Earle (1779-1863) a sculptor. He was baptised at Holy Trinity Church on 5 December 1810. His uncles owned the shipping company C & W Earle.

He studied at the local Mechanics Institute. He was apprenticed under his grandfather, George Earle (1748-1827) but, showing much talent, was sent to London in 1830 to train under Francis Chantrey. He attended the Royal Academy Schools from 1832. In 1839 he received a gold medal for his group "Hercules Delivering Hesione".

He exhibited at the Royal Academy from 1843 to 1873 and at the British Institution from 1843 to 1865.

He returned to Chantrey's studio shortly before Chantrey's death and completed several of his works including the statue of George IV commissioned for  Trafalgar Square. He left Chantrey's studio in 1842 and had his own studio by 1851 at Vincent street, Ovington Square.

He died suddenly in Hull on 2 May 1876 and is buried in Spring Bank Cemetery. He is commemorated in Holy Trinity Church by a monument of his own design.

A bombing raid on Hull in 1943 destroyed a large quantity of his work held in Hull Central Museum.

Family

In 1841 he married Mary Appleyard, daughter of builder Frank Appleyard.

Artistic recognition

He was painted by Thomas Brooks around 1840, and the portrait is held by Hull Museum.

Works
Statue of Dr John Alderson (1832) at Hull General Infirmary
The James Brothers (1837) exhibited at Royal Academy
Bust of Richard Thornton
George IV on Horseback (1842) Trafalgar Square
John Todd (1843) exhibited at Royal Academy
Richard Bethell (1845) exhibited at Royal Academy
The Morning Ablution (1845) Manchester Institution
Miss Todd (1845) Tranby Park, Yorkshire
An Ancient Briton Protecting His Family (1844) Westminster Hall
Sin Triumphant (1845) Westminster Hall
Earl of Zetland (1846) in Minerva Hall, Hull
Earl of Yarborough (1848) exhibited Royal Academy
Sir Samuel Warren (1850) exhibited at British Institution
Ophelia (1851) at Great Exhibition
Pastorella (1851) at Great Exhibition
Jacob and Rachel (1851) at Great Exhibition
L'Allegro (1852) National Exhibition
Happy as a Queen (1853) for the Earl of Yarborough
Rt Hon. Thomas Sydney (1854) exhibited Royal Academy
Bust of Queen Victoria (1861) Buckingham Palace
Queen Victoria (1863) in Pearson Park in Hull
Prince Albert (1863) Kennington
King Harold (1864) Mansion House, London
Edward I (1866) Guildhall in Hull
Thomas Teale (1867) Leeds General Infirmary
Prince Albert (1868) in Pearson Park in Hull

Grave Monuments
Sykes grave (1832) Kirk Ella west of Hull
Elizabeth Flavell (1833) Barsham in Suffolk
Monument to Ann Earle (1834), Hull Minster
Mary Burland (1835) South Cave Yorkshire
Joseph Pease (1840) St Mary's Church, Hull
Charles Bamford (1845) St Mary's Church, Sculcoates
Sir Charles Anderson of Broughton (1846) Lea, Lincolnshire
Monument to mariner and alderman Thomas Ferres (1850), Hull Minster
Monument to John Gray (1858), Hull Minster
Charles Bamford Jr. (1860) St Mary's Church, Sculcoates
John Holmes (1860) St Mary's Church, Sculcoates
Monument to Frank Appleyard, his wife's father, and her uncle John (1860), Hull Minster
Monument to Lt. Gen. Sir Robert Dundas K.C.B., St Leonard's, Loftus, North Yorkshire.

References

1810 births
1871 deaths
People from Kingston upon Hull
19th-century British sculptors